Pitambarpur railway station (station code: PMR) is a railway station on the Lucknow–Moradabad line located in the town of Faridpur in Bareilly, Uttar Pradesh, India. It is under the administrative control of the Moradabad Division of the Northern Railway zone of the Indian Railways.

Several Passenger and Express trains stop at the station.

References

Moradabad railway division
Railway stations in Bareilly district